Black Panthers is a 1968 short documentary film directed by Agnès Varda.

The film focuses on the Black Panther Party in Oakland, California, during protests over the arrest of Black Panther co-founder Huey P. Newton for the murder of police officer John Frey in 1967.

Summary
In the summer of 1968, people arrive in Oakland to protest Huey P. Newton's arrest. Newton is interviewed and talks about his poor treatment while incarcerated and talks about the ideals of the Black Panther movement which includes protecting the black community from the police, informing them of their rights, and taking advantage of license to carry firearm laws in order to arm Panthers to police the police.

Other people are interviewed, including Kathleen Cleaver who talks about the natural hair movement and the increasing importance of women in positions of authority in the Black Panther movement. The film ends with Newton's conviction for manslaughter and a hate crime involving two police officers shooting the window of a Black Panther office where Newton's picture had been hung in the front window.

Development
Varda and her crew shot the film in 1968 during her time in California while her husband Jacques Demy was in Hollywood working on Model Shop.

Release

The Criterion Collection released the film as part of the Eclipse box set Agnès Varda in California in 2015.

Reception
In 2020, Eric Kohn of IndieWire wrote of the film: "Viewed from a contemporary perspective, as the streets light up with the fury over yet more injustices against black people by the police, Black Panthers is timelier than ever, and a welcome antidote to blaring media headlines — a movie that goes beyond gawking at anger and frustration to highlight its genuine purpose."

References

External links
 
 
 
 

1968 films
1968 documentary films
1968 short films
American short documentary films
Documentary films about the Black Panther Party
Documentary films about African Americans
Documentary films about racism in the United States
Films directed by Agnès Varda
Films shot in California
French short documentary films
1960s short documentary films
1960s English-language films
1960s American films
1960s French films